Dannenberg may refer to:

Places 
 Dannenberg (Elbe), a town in Germany
 County of Dannenberg, a medieval fief founded by Henry the Lion
 Dannenberg, Pommern, German name of Domysłów, modern Poland

Other uses 
 Dannenberg (surname)